Morimus granulipennis is a species of beetle in the family Cerambycidae. It was described by Stephan von Breuning in 1939. It is known from Myanmar.

It's 14–15 mm long and 5.5–6.5 mm wide, and its type locality is Thandaung, Myanmar.

References

Phrissomini
Beetles described in 1939
Taxa named by Stephan von Breuning (entomologist)